Fistulinella wolfeana is a bolete fungus in the family Boletaceae found in Hidalgo, Mexico, where it grows under pine and oak in mixed forest. It was described as new to science in 1991.

Gallery

See also
List of North American boletes

References

External links

Boletaceae
Fungi described in 1991
Fungi of Mexico
Fungi without expected TNC conservation status